Milton "Shorty" Rogers (born Milton Rajonsky; April 14, 1924 – November 7, 1994) was an American jazz musician, one of the principal creators of West Coast jazz. He played trumpet and flugelhorn and was in demand for his skills as an arranger.

Biography
Rogers was born in Great Barrington, Massachusetts, United States. He worked first as a professional musician with Will Bradley and Red Norvo. From 1947 to 1949, he worked extensively with Woody Herman and in 1950 and 1951 he played with Stan Kenton.

On June 7, 1953, Rogers and his orchestra, including Johnny "Guitar" Watson, performed for the famed ninth Cavalcade of Jazz concert at Wrigley Field in Los Angeles, produced by Leon Hefflin, Sr. Also featured that day were Roy Brown and his Orchestra, Don Tosti and His Mexican Jazzmen, Earl Bostic, Nat "King" Cole, and Louis Armstrong and his All Stars with Velma Middleton.

From 1953 through 1962, Rogers recorded a series of albums for RCA Victor (later reissued on RCA's Bluebird label), as well as a series of albums for Atlantic Records with his own group, Shorty Rogers and His Giants, including Shorty Courts the Count (1954), The Swinging Mr. Rogers (1955), and Martians Come Back (1955), the album title alluding to the tune "Martians Go Home" which Rogers had composed and performed on The Swinging Mr. Rogers earlier the same year. These albums incorporated some of his more avant-garde music. To some extent they could be classified as "cool" jazz; but they also looked back to the "hot" style of Count Basie, whom Rogers always credited as a major inspiration. In 1957, Rogers composed the music for the Friz Freleng cartoon Three Little Bops, notably the first Warner Bros. cartoon short not to have music by either Carl Stalling or Milt Franklyn, and scored the music for the MGM film Tarzan, the Ape Man two years later.

Rogers died of melanoma in Van Nuys, California, at the age of 70.

Discography

As leader
 Modern Sounds (Capitol, 1951 [1955])
 Popo (Xanadu, 1951 [1980])
 Shorty Rogers and His Giants (RCA Victor, 1953)
 Cool and Crazy (RCA Victor, 1953)
 The Wild One [4-song 45rpm 7" vinyl EP] (RCA Victor EPA-535, 1953)
 Shorty Rogers Courts the Count (RCA Victor, 1954)
 Bud Shank – Shorty Rogers – Bill Perkins (Pacific Jazz, 1955)
 Collaboration (RCA Victor, 1955)
 The Swinging Mr. Rogers (Atlantic, 1955)
 Martians Stay Home (Atlantic, 1955 [1980])
 Martians Come Back! (Atlantic, 1955)
 Way Up There (Atlantic, 1955 [1957])
 Clickin' with Clax (Atlantic, 1956 [1978]) 
 Wherever the Five Winds Blow (RCA Victor, 1956)
 The Big Shorty Rogers Express (RCA Victor, 1956) - reissue of Cool And Crazy with 4 tracks added on
 Shorty Rogers Plays Richard Rodgers (RCA Victor, 1957)
 Portrait of Shorty (RCA Victor, 1957)
 Gigi in Jazz (RCA Victor, 1958)
 Afro-Cuban Influence (RCA Victor, 1958)
 Chances Are It Swings (RCA Victor, 1958)
 The Wizard of Oz and Other Harold Arlen Songs (RCA Victor, 1959)
 Shorty Rogers Meets Tarzan (MGM, 1960) 
 The Swingin' Nutcracker (RCA Victor, 1960)
 An Invisible Orchard (RCA Victor, 1961 [1997])
 The Fourth Dimension in Sound (Warner Bros., 1962)
 Bossa Nova (Reprise, 1962)
 Jazz Waltz (Reprise, 1962)
 Mavis Meets Shorty (Reprise, 1962)
 Gospel Mission (Capitol, 1963)
 Re-Entry (Atlas, 1983)
 Yesterday, Today and Forever (Concord Jazz, 1983)
 Back Again (Choice, 1984)
 California Concert (Contemporary, 1985)
 America the Beautiful (Candid, 1991)
 Eight Brothers (Candid, 1992)

As sideman
With Elmer Bernstein
 The Man with the Golden Arm (Decca, 1956)

With Teddy Charles
 Collaboration West (Prestige, 1953)
 Evolution (Prestige, 1957)

With Jimmy Giuffre
 Jimmy Giuffre (Capitol, 1955)
 The Jimmy Giuffre Clarinet (Atlantic, 1956)

With Stan Kenton
 Innovations in Modern Music (Capitol, 1950)
 Stan Kenton Presents (Capitol, 1950)
 Popular Favorites by Stan Kenton (Capitol, 1953)
 The Kenton Era (Capitol, 1940–1954 [1955])
 The Innovations Orchestra (Capitol, 1950–1951 [1997])

With Eartha Kitt
 St. Louis Blues (RCA Victor, 1958)

With Perez Prado
 Voodoo Suite (RCA Victor, 1955)

With Pete Rugolo
 Introducing Pete Rugolo (Columbia, 1954)
 Adventures in Rhythm (Columbia, 1954)
 Rugolomania (Columbia, 1955)
 New Sounds by Pete Rugolo (Harmony, 1954–1955 [1957])

As arranger
With Herb Alpert & the Tijuana Brass
Christmas Album (A&M, 1968)
Warm (A&M, 1969)

With Ernie Andrews
Soul Proprietor (Dot, 1968)

With Chet Baker
Chet Baker & Strings (Columbia, 1954)

With Elmer Bernstein
Baby the Rain Must Fall (Mainstream, 1965)

With Les Brown and His Band of Renown
The Young Beat (Capitol, 1963)

With Bobby Bryant
The Jazz Excursion Into "Hair" (Pacific Jazz, 1969)

With Bobby Darin
You're the Reason I'm Living (Capitol, 1963)
Bobby Darin Sings The Shadow of Your Smile (Atlantic, 1966)

With Frances Faye
You Gotta Go! Go! Go! (Regina, 1964)

With Bobbie Gentry
Ode to Billie Joe (Capitol, 1967)
Local Gentry (Capitol, 1968)
The Delta Sweete (Capitol, 1968)

With Terry Gibbs
Reza (Dot, 1966)

With Jerry Goldsmith
Stagecoach (Mainstream, 1966)

With Vince Guaraldi
Alma-Ville (Warner Bros.-Seven Arts, 1969)

With Lena Horne
Lena Like Latin (CRC Charter, 1963)

With Helen Humes
Midsummer Night's Songs (RCA, 1974) with Red Norvo and His Orchestra

With Dean Jones
Introducing Dean Jones (Valiant, 1963)

with Frankie Laine
You Gave Me a Mountain (ABC, 1969)

With Peggy Lee
In Love Again! (Capitol, 1964)
Pass Me By (Capitol, 1965)

With Harvey Mandel
 Righteous (Philips, 1969)
 Baby Batter (Janus, 1971)

With Shelly Manne
The West Coast Sound (Contemporary, 1955)
My Son the Jazz Drummer! (Contemporary, 1962)

With Carmen McRae
The Sound of Silence (Atlantic, 1968)
Portrait of Carmen (Atlantic, 1968)

With The Monkees
"Daydream Believer"/"Goin' Down" (Colgems, 1967)
"D. W. Washburn"/"It's Nice to Be with You" (Colgems, 1968)
The Birds, The Bees & The Monkees (Colgems, 1968)
The Monkees Present (Colgems, 1969)

With Michael Nesmith
The Wichita Train Whistle Sings (Dot, 1968)

With Jack Nitzsche
Heart Beat (Soundtrack) (Capitol, 1980)

With Buddy Rich
Big Swing Face, Pacific Jazz, 1967)
Buddy & Soul (World Pacific, 1969)

With Bud Shank
A Spoonful of Jazz (World Pacific, 1967)

With Mel Tormé
Comin' Home Baby! (Atlantic, 1962)

See also
List of jazz arrangers

References

External links
 Shorty Rogers biography
 Alphabet Conspiracy - Shorty makes a brief appearance in this 1959 educational film.
 
 

1924 births
1994 deaths
20th-century American Jews
20th-century American male musicians
20th-century American musicians
20th-century trumpeters
American jazz trumpeters
American male jazz musicians
American male trumpeters
American music arrangers
Atlantic Records artists
Big band bandleaders
Burials at Mount Sinai Memorial Park Cemetery
Cool jazz trumpeters
Deaths from cancer in California
Deaths from melanoma
Fiorello H. LaGuardia High School alumni
Fresh Sounds Records artists
Jazz musicians from Massachusetts
Jazz musicians from New York (state)
Jewish American musicians
Jewish jazz musicians
People from Great Barrington, Massachusetts
RCA Victor artists
Reprise Records artists
Warner Records artists